Gymnogeophagus is a genus of cichlid fishes from South America, where they are known from various river basins (notably Rio de la Plata and Lagoa dos Patos–Mirim) in southern Brazil, Paraguay, Uruguay and northern Argentina. They are part of a group popularly known as eartheaters.

Species
There are currently 18 recognized species in this genus:

 Gymnogeophagus australis (C. H. Eigenmann, 1907) (Uruguayan eartheater)
 Gymnogeophagus balzanii (Perugia, 1891) (Argentine eartheater)
 Gymnogeophagus caaguazuensis Staeck, 2006
 Gymnogeophagus che Casciotta, S. E. Gómez & Toresanni, 2000 
 Gymnogeophagus constellatus L. R. Malabarba, M. C. Malabarba & R. E. dos Reis, 2015
 Gymnogeophagus gymnogenys (R. F. Hensel, 1870) (Smooth-cheek eartheater)
 Gymnogeophagus jaryi Alonso et al., 2019
 Gymnogeophagus labiatus (R. F. Hensel, 1870) (Earth eater)
 Gymnogeophagus lacustris R. E. dos Reis & L. R. Malabarba, 1988
 Gymnogeophagus lipokarenos L. R. Malabarba, M. C. Malabarba & R. E. dos Reis, 2015
 Gymnogeophagus mekinos L. R. Malabarba, M. C. Malabarba & R. E. dos Reis, 2015
 Gymnogeophagus meridionalis R. E. dos Reis & L. R. Malabarba, 1988
 Gymnogeophagus missioneiro L. R. Malabarba, M. C. Malabarba & R. E. dos Reis, 2015
 Gymnogeophagus pseudolabiatus L. R. Malabarba, M. C. Malabarba & R. E. dos Reis, 2015
 Gymnogeophagus rhabdotus (R. F. Hensel, 1870) (Stripe-fin eartheater)
 Gymnogeophagus setequedas R. E. dos Reis, L. R. Malabarba & Pavanelli, 1992
 Gymnogeophagus terrapurpura Loureiro, Zarucki, L. R. Malabarba & González-Bergonzoni, 2016
 Gymnogeophagus tiraparae González-Bergonzoni, Loureiro & Oviedo, 2009

References

 
Fish of South America
Geophagini
Cichlid genera
Taxa named by Alípio de Miranda-Ribeiro